Ahmed Friaa (Tunisian Arabic: أحمد فريعة) (born February 19, 1949) was the Minister of the Interior of Tunisia for two weeks in January 2011, during the peak of Tunisian revolution.

Biography
Ahmed Friaa was born in 1949. He holds a PhD from the Paris-Sorbonne University.

He served as Housing Minister, then Education Minister, followed by Ambassador to Italy. On January 12, 2011, following the dismissal of Rafiq Belhaj Kacem, he was appointed as Minister of the Interior. On 27 January 2011 he was replaced by Farhat Rajhi. He was a founding member of the Homeland Party in early March, but announced his retirement on 14 June 2011.

References 

1949 births
People from Zarzis
University of Paris alumni
Government ministers of Tunisia
Living people
Interior ministers of Tunisia
Tunisian expatriates in France